André Mélardy was a Belgian water polo player. He competed in the men's tournament at the 1928 Summer Olympics.

References

Year of birth missing
Year of death missing
Belgian male water polo players
Olympic water polo players of Belgium
Water polo players at the 1928 Summer Olympics
Place of birth missing